Neocorynura is a genus of bees belonging to the family Apidae.

The species of this genus are found in South America.

Species:

Neocorynura aenigma 
Neocorynura atromarginata 
Neocorynura autrani 
Neocorynura azyx 
Neocorynura banarae 
Neocorynura brachycera 
Neocorynura caligans 
Neocorynura centroamericana 
Neocorynura cercops 
Neocorynura chapadicola 
Neocorynura chrysops 
Neocorynura cicur 
Neocorynura claviventris 
Neocorynura codion 
Neocorynura colombiana 
Neocorynura cribrita 
Neocorynura cuprifrons 
Neocorynura cyaneon 
Neocorynura dilutipes 
Neocorynura diploon 
Neocorynura discolor 
Neocorynura discolorata 
Neocorynura dittachos 
Neocorynura electra 
Neocorynura erinnys 
Neocorynura euadne 
Neocorynura fumipennis 
Neocorynura fuscipes 
Neocorynura gaucha
Neocorynura guarani
Neocorynura guatemalensis 
Neocorynura hemidiodiae 
Neocorynura icosi 
Neocorynura iguaquensis 
Neocorynura iopodion 
Neocorynura lampter 
Neocorynura lasipion 
Neocorynura lepidodes 
Neocorynura lignys 
Neocorynura marginans 
Neocorynura melamptera 
Neocorynura miae
Neocorynura minae 
Neocorynura monozona 
Neocorynura muiscae 
Neocorynura nean 
Neocorynura nictans 
Neocorynura nigroaenea 
Neocorynura norops 
Neocorynura nossax 
Neocorynura notoplex 
Neocorynura nuda 
Neocorynura oiospermi 
Neocorynura panamensis 
Neocorynura papallactensis 
Neocorynura peruvicola 
Neocorynura pleurites 
Neocorynura polybioides 
Neocorynura pseudobaccha 
Neocorynura pubescens 
Neocorynura pycnon 
Neocorynura pyrrhothrix 
Neocorynura rhytis 
Neocorynura riverai 
Neocorynura roxane 
Neocorynura rubida 
Neocorynura rufa 
Neocorynura rutilans 
Neocorynura sequax 
Neocorynura sophia
Neocorynura spizion 
Neocorynura squamans 
Neocorynura stilborhin 
Neocorynura sulfurea 
Neocorynura tangophyla
Neocorynura tarpeia 
Neocorynura tica 
Neocorynura trachycera 
Neocorynura triacontas 
Neocorynura unicincta 
Neocorynura villosissima

References

Apidae